Hot Country Songs is a chart that ranks the top-performing country music songs in the United States, published by Billboard magazine.  In 1986, 52 different songs topped the chart, then published under the title Hot Country Singles, based on playlists submitted by country music radio stations and sales reports submitted by stores.  No song managed more than a single week at number one during the year.

The first number one of the year was "Have Mercy" by mother-daughter duo the Judds.  In the fall, Conway Twitty achieved his 40th and final Hot Country number one with "Desperado Love", 18 years after he first topped the chart with "Next in Line".  Twitty's total of 40 number ones would remain a record for the highest number of country chart-toppers by an artist until 2006, when the record was broken by George Strait.  Two female acts tied for the most number ones of the year, each reaching the top spot three times: the Forester Sisters (including one in collaboration with the Bellamy Brothers) and the Judds.  More than a dozen acts each achieved two number ones, including Crystal Gayle and Gary Morris, who each achieved one solo number one as well as performing together on the hit "Makin' Up for Lost Time (The Dallas Lovers' Song)".  One of Juice Newton's two number ones, "Both to Each Other (Friends and Lovers)", a duet with Eddie Rabbitt, had originally been performed by Gloria Loring and Carl Anderson on the soap opera Days of Our Lives the previous year. The song was not initially released commercially, but after Newton and Rabbitt's version became a hit, Loring and Anderson's recording was released and topped the Hot Adult Contemporary chart, meaning that versions of the same song by two different acts were number ones in their respective genres within a month of each other.

Acts to top the country chart for the first time in 1986 included Randy Travis with "On the Other Hand".  Upon its initial release, the song had failed to even break into the top 40, but after Travis reached the top 10 with the song "1982", "On the Other Hand" was re-released and this time went all the way to number one, giving Travis his first chart-topper.  Later in the year, T. Graham Brown achieved his first number one with "Hell and High Water", and the band Restless Heart reached the top of the chart for the first time with "That Rock Won't Roll", one of four chart-topping singles to be taken from the album Wheels.  Hank Williams Jr. ended the year in the top spot with his version of "Mind Your Own Business", a song originally recorded by his father Hank Williams in 1949.  The new recording featured vocal contributions from country singers Reba McEntire and Willie Nelson, rocker Tom Petty and Reverend Ike, a televangelist.

Chart history

See also
 1986 in music
 List of artists who reached number one on the U.S. country chart

References

1986
1986 record charts
Country